Psychotria insularum is a rainforest understory shrub from the coffee family, Rubiaceae. Its native range is the South Pacific. 

It has traditional uses in herbal medicine. In 2021, the potent anti-inflammatory rutin was isolated from P. insularum (known in Samoa as "matalafi").

References

Flora of Brazil
insularum
Taxa named by John Edward Gray